Červený Kameň Castle is a 13th-century castle in southwestern Slovakia in the Little Carpathians near the village of Častá.

History 
A stone castle was built by Tiburtius Rosd or his descendants in the 13th century as part of the chain of the Kingdom of Hungary’s frontier defense castles ranging from Pressburg to Žilina. This castle was completely rebuilt as a fortress in the first half of the 16th century. When the Pálffy family acquired the castle in 1588, the fortress was completed, and it became a representative noble castle.

Although the castle was damaged several times by fire, it was always reconstructed by the Pálffys, who were the owners of the castle until the Second World War. Today, the castle is a museum.

See also 
 List of castles in Slovakia

References

External links 
 Červený Kameň Museum at SlovakNationalMuseum.sk
 Červený Kameň at slovakheritage.org

Castles in Slovakia
16th-century architecture in Slovakia
Renaissance architecture in Slovakia
Buildings and structures in Bratislava Region